Budapest Bank is a commercial bank founded in 1987 with headquarters in Budapest, Hungary.

In 1995 the bank was sold to GE Capital, but in 2015 it became again a state owned bank.

In 2020 the MKB Bank, the Budapest Bank and the MTB (Takarékbank) became part of the Magyar Bankholding Zrt. In 2022 Budapest Bank merged into MKB.

Buildings

See also 
List of banks in Hungary

References

External links 
Homepage

Banks of Hungary
Companies based in Budapest
Hungarian brands
Banks established in 1987 
Hungarian companies established in 1987